Kasipul is a constituency in Kenya. It is one of eight constituencies in Homa Bay County. Kasipul constituency was established from the 2010 constitution with the code number 245 from Kasipul kabondo constituency and Kabondo constituency formed the other half. The home town for the residents is Oyugis which is one of the Municipalities in Homabay County.

Kasipul constituency has five wards namely: East kamagak, West kamagak, South kasipul, West kasipul  and Central kasipul

SUB-LOCATIONS PER WARD

 WEST KASIPUL WARD 1221; Kadel Kamidigo, Kodera Kamiyawa, Kotieno Kochich, Kotieno Konuonga and Kadel Karabach.
 SOUTH KASIPUL WARD 1222; Kanyango, Kawino, Kasimba and Kokal
 CENTRAL KASIPUL WARD 1223; Kawere East, Kawere West, North Kachien, Nyalenda and South Kachien
 EAST KAMAGAK WARD 1224; Kachieng and Sino Kagola
 WEST KAMAGAK WARD 1225; Kamuma and Obisa

The current member of parliament is Hon. Sir Charles Ong'ondo Were.

Members of parliament since independence

1963 - Samwel Onyango Ayodo - KANU

1969 - James Ezekiel Mbori - KANU

1974 - Samwel Onyango Ayodo - KANU

1979 - Samwel Onyango Ayodo - KANU

1983 - James Ezekiel Mbori - KANU

1988 - James Ezekiel Mbori - KANU

1992 - Otieno Kopiyo - FORD KENYA

1997 - William Oloo Tula - NDP

2002 - Peter Owidi - NARC

2005 - Paddy Ahenda - LPK - By election

2007 - Joseph Oyugi Magwanga - ODM

2013 - Joseph Oyugi Magwanga - ODM

2017 - Charles Ong'ondo Were - ODM

2022- Charles Ong'ondo Were- ODM

References 

Constituencies in Homa Bay County